World Cup Carnival is a 1986 sports video game developed by Artic Computing and published by U.S. Gold for the Amstrad CPC, Commodore 64 and ZX Spectrum; it is the first licensed World Cup video game and is based on the 1986 FIFA World Cup in Mexico. Initially meant as an entirely different game, development problems made U.S. Gold decide to recycle Artic Computing's 1984 title World Cup Football, with the added FIFA license and extras included in the box.

Upon release, World Cup Carnival received unanimously negative reviews from critics, players and retailers alike for its poor graphics, gameplay, sound and blatant recycling of World Cup Football; several magazines included angry letters from people who had bought the game, many of which were returned to stores.

Gameplay
Ten teams (Uruguay, Italy, Germany, Brazil, England, Argentina, France, Spain, Mexico and Scotland) are available in the Commodore 64 and Amstrad CPC versions of the game while all 24 teams that played in the 1986 World Cup are available in the ZX Spectrum version. For all three platforms, the World Cup mode is played from the quarter finals onwards. Additionally, there is a training mode that includes penalty taking in all three versions. Matches last for 3 minutes, and there is no ability to change formation settings etc.

Reception

Critical response 
At the time of its release Zzap!64 awarded the C64 version of the game an overall score of just 11%. Crash scored the ZX Spectrum version 26% and the reviewer stated "This is the worst football simulation I have ever seen".

Prism Leisure lawsuit 
Shortly after the game's release, developer Artic Computing was sued by Prism Leisure Corporation for copyright infringement as they had sold the copyright of World Cup Football in 1985 to keep the company afloat; Prism quickly won the lawsuit with Artic requiring to pay Prism for all the sales of World Cup Carnival, bankrupting the company in the process.

Reviews
Computer and Video Games
Computer Gamer
Zzap!

Follow up games

Despite the overwhelmingly poor reception, U.S. Gold attempted to get the 1990 FIFA World Cup license in Italy; they failed, however, with Virgin Mastertronic gaining the license and developing World Cup Soccer: Italia '90; U.S. Gold soon released their game as Italy 1990.

References

See also
 FIFA World Cup video games

1986 FIFA World Cup
1986 video games
Amstrad CPC games
Association football video games
Commodore 64 games
FIFA World Cup video games
Multiplayer and single-player video games
U.S. Gold games
Video games set in 1986
ZX Spectrum games
Video games developed in the United Kingdom
Video games set in Mexico
Artic Computing games